Kapit may refer to:
Kapit
Kapit (federal constituency), represented in the Dewan Rakyat